The General William Rosecrans Headquarters (also known as the Rosser Alston House) is a historic residence in Stevenson, Alabama.  The house is a single-story brick hall and parlor house built circa 1855 as a residence for railroad engineers who were building the routes through Jackson County.  In the buildup to the Chickamauga Campaign of the American Civil War, Union General William Rosecrans selected Stevenson as the staging site for battle.  In addition to building Fort Harker just south of town, Rosecrans used the house as his personal headquarters.  Walter Rosser, a construction engineer from Michigan, purchased the house and land before the war, and lived in the house after the war.  As of 1978, the house was in ruins, with the roof, one wall and parts of the others collapsed.  The house was listed on the National Register of Historic Places in 1978.

References

National Register of Historic Places in Jackson County, Alabama
Houses on the National Register of Historic Places in Alabama
Houses completed in 1855
Houses in Jackson County, Alabama
Alabama in the American Civil War
Chickamauga campaign
Headquarters